Diego Moldes González (born 27 January 1977) is a Spanish writer, critic and film historian.

Biography 

Born in Pontevedra, Diego Moldes has published eleven books of non-fiction, narrative and poetry. Among these are the historic novel Daydreaming, and cultural essays such as Vertigo´s Footprint (2004); Roman Polanski: The tormented fantasy (2005), the first book about Roman Polanski in Spanish; European Cinema: The Great Movies (2018); and Alejandro Jodorowsky (2012), a monography prefaced by Jodorowsky himself. Moldes is also the author of Venuspassion (2014), with and introduction by Luis Alberto de Cuenca, and Not One Day Without Poetry (2018), a poetry book.

In November 2019 he published his eleventh book, a lengthy essay: When Einstein Met Kafka. Contributions of the Jews to the Modern World (2019). The book is the result of twenty years of reading more than three hundred books and more than two thousand articles and documents, as well as the viewing of some two hundred documentary and fiction films. The prestigious Catalan critic Toni Montesinos praised the book, calling it "great merit" and "formidable work". It also received positive reviews in other Spanish media such as Televisión Española, El País, La vanguardia, ABC or El mundo.

Diego Moldes holds a degree in Advertising and PR from the Faculty of Communication of Pontevedra, a master in publishing (from Oxford Brookes University / Publish Editrain) and a PhD in information science (audio-visual communications) from the Complutense University of Madrid.

In 2000, he became a TVG presenter in Galicia: three years later, he moved toward marketing, advertising, and digital content in the cultural field, chiefly focusing on book, movies, music and comics. His connection to Judaism led him to collaborate with the Sefard-Israel Centre  and Raices: Revista judia de cultura (Roots: a Jewish Cultural Magazine). From 2015 to 2018, he served as direct-general of Hispanic-Jewish Foundation. In 2015, he became president of the Fania Association, a group which combats antisemitism and supports cultural endeavours. In 2019, he became director of institutional relations of the Nebrija University and the Antonio de Nebrija Foundation.

Published work

Narrative 

 Daydreaming (Ensoñación, Ediciones Pigmalión, Madrid, 2012), novel. 
 Venuspassion (Venuspasión, Notorious Ediciones, Madrid, 2014), essay, narrative, stories and poetry.

Poetry 

 Not One Day Without Poetry (Ni un día sin poesía, Ed. Mueve tu lengua, Madrid, 2018), poems. Foreword by Alejandro Jodorowsky.

Essay 

 When Einstein meet Kafka. Contributions of the Jews to the modern world (Cuando Einstein encontró a Kafka. Contribuciones de los judíos al mundo moderno, Barcelona, Galaxia Gutenberg, 2019). Foreword by Esther Bendahan.

Film books 

 Vertigo's footprint  (La huella de Vértigo, Ediciones JC, Madrid, 2004). Film Essay on the Influence of Vertigo, by Alfred Hitchcock.
 Roman Polanski. The fantasy of the tormented (Roman Polanski. La fantasía del atormentado, Ediciones JC, Madrid, 2005). Essay.
 European cinema. Great movies (El cine europeo. Las grandes películas. Ediciones JC, Madrid, 2008). Essay on European Sound Cinema (1930-2007).
 The manuscript found in Zaragoza. The novel of Jan Potocki adapted to the cinema by Wojciech Jerzy Has (El manuscrito encontrado en Zaragoza. La novela de Jan Potocki adaptada al cine por Wojciech Jerzy Has, Ediciones Calamar, Madrid, 2009).
 Alejandro Jodorowsky (Col. Signo e Imagen / Cineastas, Ediciones Cátedra, Madrid, 2012). Monographic essay, foreword by A. Jodorowsky, 496 pages.

References 

Historians of Jews and Judaism
Spanish television writers
Philosephardism in Spain
Spanish-language writers
21st-century Spanish writers
Spanish film critics
University of Vigo alumni
1977 births
Living people
Jewish Spanish history